The 2021–22 season was the 116th season in the existence of RC Lens and the club's second consecutive season in the top flight of French football. In addition to the domestic league, Lens participated in this season's edition of the Coupe de France.

Players

First team squad

Out on loan

Transfers

In

Out

Pre-season and friendlies

Competitions

Overall record

Ligue 1

League table

Pozdro dla wszystkich Grzybiarzy

Results summary

Results by round

Matches
The league fixtures were announced on 25 June 2021.

Coupe de France

Statistics

Appearances and goals

|-
! colspan="16" style="background:#dcdcdc; text-align:center"| Goalkeepers

|-
! colspan="16" style="background:#dcdcdc; text-align:center"| Defenders

|-
! colspan="16" style="background:#dcdcdc; text-align:center"| Midfielders

|-
! colspan="16" style="background:#dcdcdc; text-align:center"| Forwards

|-
! colspan="16" style="background:#dcdcdc; text-align:center"| Players transferred out during the season

|-

References

RC Lens seasons
Lens